Miamira magnifica is a species of colourful dorid nudibranch, a sea slug, a shell-less marine gastropod mollusk in the family Chromodorididae. Previously synonymised with Ceratosoma this genus is considered valid on the basis of molecular phylogeny.

Distribution
This species was described from the Seychelles.

Description
The differences between this species and Miamira sinuata and Miamira flavicostata are not clear.

References

External links
 

Chromodorididae
Gastropods described in 1910